The Annala Round Barn near Hurley, Wisconsin, United States, is a round barn that was built in 1921 according to the NRIS database.  It was listed on the National Register of Historic Places in 1979.  The listing included two contributing buildings.

According to another source, it was built in 1917 by Finnish stonemason Matt Annala.

It is asserted to be the "only barn in Wisconsin entirely made of massive field stones."

References

Barns on the National Register of Historic Places in Wisconsin
Buildings and structures completed in 1921
Buildings and structures in Iron County, Wisconsin
Round barns in Wisconsin
National Register of Historic Places in Iron County, Wisconsin